China Securities Finance Corp., Ltd. (CSF) is a Chinese state-owned  financial services company founded in 2011. The company funded securities firm of China (firm that provides investment banking and brokage)  for their margin business as well as lending securities for short selling business.

It also bought shares from the market as a SPV for government intervention. The company later transferred some of the securities it bought to Central Huijin Investment, the domestic arm of the sovereign wealth fund of China.

Shareholders

 Shanghai Stock Exchange (25.13%)
 Shenzhen Stock Exchange (25.13%)
 Shanghai Futures Exchange (17.59%)
 China Securities Depository and Clearing Corporation (14.57%)
 China Financial Futures Exchange (8.04%)
 Dalian Commodity Exchange (6.03%)
 Zhengzhou Commodity Exchange (3.52%)

See also
 National Equities Exchange and Quotations sister company

References

External links
 

Banks of China
Financial services companies of China
Chinese companies established in 2011
Companies based in Beijing